Black ironwood is a common name for several plants and may refer to:

 Allagoptera caudescens, Borassus flabellifer, Caryota urens, Iriartea deltoidea  Black Palm, Palmira wood 
 Colophospermum mopane
 Krugiodendron ferreum, a species of tree found in the Americas
 Olea capensis, a species of tree found in afromontane forests throughout Africa
 Olea woodiana
 Picrodendron baccatum 
 Rothmannia capensis 
 Sloanea dentata